Micropholis madeirensis is a species of plant in the family Sapotaceae. It is found in Brazil and Peru.

References

madeirensis
Near threatened plants
Trees of Peru
Taxonomy articles created by Polbot
Taxa named by André Aubréville
Taxa named by Charles Baehni